Fish oil, sold under the brand name Omegaven, is a fatty acid emulsion. It is used for total parenteral nutrition (feeding directly into a venous catheter), e.g. in short bowel syndrome. It is rich in omega-3 fatty acids.

Fish oil is composed of two omega-3 fatty acids, docosahexaenoic acid (DHA) and eicosapentaenoic acid (EPA).  They are generally in the form of triglycerides which are converted to the free acids upon digestion.

It has gained popularity in children in preference to the more commonly used intralipid after case reports that it reduced the risk of liver damage.

A 2007, study indicated that the use of Omegaven may be an appropriate intervention strategy for newborns with a very low birth weight, gastroschisis, and intestinal atresia.

A clinical trial exploring the use of fish oil as an adjunct to parenteral nutrition in surgical intensive care units at National Taiwan University Hospital completed in March 2007.

Although the use of fish oil triglycerides in children in the United States is experimental, the use of it in adults in Europe is less controversial. In European studies, fish oil triglycerides have been associated with a reduction in psoriasis, when contrasted to administration of omega-6 fatty acid Lipoven. Fish oil triglycerides have also been associated with reduced mortality and antibiotic use during hospital stays.

Fish oil triglycerides was approved for use in the United States on July 27, 2018, and is available to patients on the US market by prescription effective November 15, 2018.

References

External links 
 
 
 "The Right Kind of Oil" at Children's Hospital Boston
 Team on a Mission at Toronto Star
 Old Fashioned Lifeline Boston Globe 1/9/2009
 rockcenter.nbcnews.com: drug treatment omegaven that could save infants lives not yet approved by fda

Intensive care medicine
Hepatology
Gastroenterology
Pediatrics
Malnutrition
Orphan drugs